The legal recognition of signed languages differs widely. In some jurisdictions (countries, states, provinces or regions), a signed language is recognised as an official language; in others, it has a protected status in certain areas (such as education). Although a government may stipulate in its constitution (or laws) that a "signed language" is recognised, it may fail to specify  signed language; several different signed languages may be commonly used.

The most frequently used framework for the legal recognition of sign languages, adopted and further developed by the World Federation of the Deaf, was developed by Dr Maartje De Meulder.

Extending legal recognition is a major concern of Deaf culture. Symbolic recognition does not guarantee an improvement in the lives of signed-language users, and it has been argued that signed languages should be supported not merely as an accommodation for disabled people, but as a communication medium in language communities.

Status by country

Australia
Auslan was recognised by the Australian government as a "community language other than English" and the preferred language of the Deaf community in 1987 and 1991 policy statements. Although the recognition does not ensure the provision of services in Auslan, its use in Deaf education and by Auslan-English interpreters is becoming more common.

Austria
Austrian Sign Language (Österreichische Gebärdensprache, or ÖGS) was recognised by the Austrian Parliament in 2005. On 1 September 2005, the Constitution of Austria was amended to include a new article: §8 (3) Die Österreichische Gebärdensprache ist als eigenständige Sprache anerkannt. Das Nähere bestimmen die Gesetze. ("Austrian Sign Language is recognised as an independent language. The laws will determine the details.")

Belgium

French Community
Belgium's Parliament of the French Community recognised French Belgian Sign Language (LSFB) by decree in October 2003. The recognition entails:
 cultural (symbolic) recognition 
 the formation of a commission to advise the Government of the French Community in all LSFB-related matters

According to the Décret relatif à la reconnaissance de la langue des signes (Decree on the Recognition of Sign Language), "It concerns a symbolic recognition that goes hand-in-hand with a general measure, permitting every minister to take action in fields relative to his authority."

Flemish Community
Flemish Sign Language ( or VGT) was recognised on 24 April 2006 by the Flemish Parliament. The recognition entails:
 a cultural (symbolic) recognition 
 the formation of a commission to advise the Flemish government on all VGT-related matters
 funding of VGT research and development

Brazil
Although Brazilian Sign Language (LIBRAS) was legally recognised in 2002, a 2005 law stipulated that it could not replace written Portuguese. The language must be taught as a part of the speech-language pathology curriculum, and LIBRAS is an elective undergraduate subject.

Canada
The Accessible Canada Act, passed on 21 June 2019, recognised "American Sign Language (ASL), Quebec Sign Language and Indigenous sign languages (...) as the primary languages for communication by deaf persons in Canada." Inuit Sign Language (IUR), used in Canada's Arctic communities, was developed locally by families and communities for their deaf families and community members. Deaf Inuit who have attended school in southern Canada have also learned ASL. IUR made its debut in the Nunavut legislature in 2008.

Maritime Sign Language (MSL), which derives from British Sign Language, is moribund in Canada's Maritime provinces. It is not officially recognised, and has been replaced by ASL in schools. The Halifax School for the Deaf, which operated from 1856 to June 1961, taught in MSL; after that, the Interprovincial School for the Education of the Deaf (later renamed the Atlantic Provinces Special Education Authority, or APSEA) in Amherst, Nova Scotia, took over until it closed in 1995.

Chile
Chilean Sign Language ( or LSCh), was enacted as Law No. 20,422 in 2010 to ensure equal opportunity for disabled people. The law recognises sign language as the natural means of communication for the deaf community.

Czech Republic
Czech Sign Language gained legal recognition with the passage of the Sign Language Law, 155/1998 Sb ("Zákon o znakové řeči 155/1998 Sb").

Denmark

Danish Sign Language gained legal recognition on 13 May 2014. The Danish Parliament established the Danish Sign Language Council "to devise principles and guidelines for the monitoring of the Danish sign language and offer advice and information on the Danish sign language."

European Union
The European Parliament unanimously approved a resolution about sign languages on 17 June 1988. The resolution suggests that all member states recognise their sign languages as official languages of the Deaf community.

The EP issued another resolution in 1998, with essentially the same content as the 1988 resolution. A third resolution was passed in 2016. It was drafted by Helga Stevens, Europe's first deaf female MEP and president of the European Union of the Deaf from 2005 to 2007. The resolution, on sign language and professional sign-language interpreters, draws on Deaf studies and linguistics.

Finland
Finnish Sign Language was recognised in the constitution in August 1995:

Iceland
Icelandic Sign Language was recognised by law in education in 2004:

Indian subcontinent
Although Indo-Pakistani Sign Language (IPSL) is officially unrecognised, it is used in India, Bangladesh, and Pakistan.

Ireland
The Recognition of Irish Sign Language for the Deaf Community Bill 2016 passed the Irish Parliament on 14 December 2017, and was signed into law by President Michael D. Higgins on 24 December of that year. Before 2017, there was no automatic right for deaf people to have an ISL interpreter except for criminal-court proceedings. ISL recognition provides more legal rights and better access to public services, including education, healthcare, media and banking.

Italy
Italian Sign Language (Lingua dei Segni Italiana, LIS) was recognised on 19 May 2021. Although opponents of LIS recognition say that it is not a language because it lacks grammar, its grammar has been studied.

Kenya
The 2010 Constitution of Kenya recognises Kenyan Sign Language and, according to Article 7.3b, says that Kenya would promote its development and use. KSL is given official status in Article 120 (1), which says that "the official languages of Parliament are Kiswahili, English and Kenyan Sign Language and the business of Parliament may be conducted in English, Kiswahili and Kenyan Sign Language."

Malta 
Maltese Sign Language (or LSM) was officially recognised by the Parliament of Malta in March 2016.

Mexico 

Mexican Sign Language (lengua de señas mexicana, or LSM) was declared a "national language" in 2003, and it began use in public deaf education. Deaf education in Mexico had focused on oralism (speech and lipreading), and few schools conducted classes in LSM.

Nepal
Although Nepali Sign Language has not been recognised as the official language of Nepal's deaf population, legislation is proposed which will bring Nepali law into line with the UN Convention on the Rights of Persons with Disabilities.

Netherlands

Dutch Sign Language (or NGT) was recognised by law in 2020. The Christian Union party introduced a bill to recognise NGT in 2010, but it did not pass.
In October 2016, MPs Roelof van Laar (Labour Party) and Carla Dik-Faber (Christian Union) proposed a bill legally recognising NGT as an official language. MP Attje Kuiken (Labour Party) took over the bill in September 2019 (after Van Laar's departure), and MP Jessica van Eijs (Democrats 66) joined Kuiken and Dik-Faber. At the end of the month, the Advisory Division of the Council of State said that the text of the bill was still too vague and did not clarify which problems it intended to address and how it would do so; it asked if "the Deaf culture" mentioned in the bill also needed to be legally recognised and, if so, what that term entailed.

New Zealand
New Zealand Sign Language became the country's third official language, joining English and Māori, when a bill was passed in the New Zealand Parliament on 6 April 2006.

North Macedonia 
Macedonian Sign Language is officially recognized as a "natural way of communication between people", and is regulated by a law which allows anyone in North Macedonia to study it. The law also ensures the right to an interpreter upon request.

Northern Ireland
British and Irish Sign Language were recognised as official languages by the Northern Ireland Office in 2004.

Norway
Norwegian Sign Language is recognised by law for education.

Papua New Guinea
Papua New Guinean Sign Language became the country's fourth official language in May 2015.

Philippines 
Article 3 of Republic Act No. 11106 declared Filipino Sign Language the country's national sign language, specifying that it be recognized, supported and promoted as the medium of official communication in all transactions involving the deaf and the language of instruction in deaf education.

Peru
Peru officially recognized Peruvian Sign Language as the country's national sign language by law published in the official Gazette on 21 May. (Diario Oficial El Peruano

Portugal

Russia
Russian Sign Language has limited legal recognition. Under the federal Law on Protection of People with Disabilities, it is considered a language used for inter-personal communication only; no state support is provided.

Slovakia 
Slovak Sign Language was recognised in 1995 by law.

South Africa 
South African Sign Language (SASL) is not specifically recognised as an official language by the country's constitution, and the phrase "sign language" is used generically.
On 13 November 2009, the Constitutional Review Committee met to explore the possibility of upgrading SASL to South Africa's 12th official language. In May 2022 the 18th Constitutional Amendment Bill to make SASL an official language, was published for public comment.

South Korea 
The "South Korean National Assembly passed legislation to recognize Korean Sign Language as one of Korea's official languages" on 31 December 2015.

Spain

Valencia

Sri Lanka 
According to a 23 September 2010 report, Sri Lankan Sign Language has been officially recognised.

Thailand
Thai Sign Language was recognised as "the national language of deaf people in Thailand" on 17 August 1999 in a resolution signed by the Permanent Secretary for Education on behalf of the Royal Thai Government which affirmed the rights of deaf people to learn the language at home and in schools. According to a 13 October 1999 report by Charles Reilly, "specific actions will be taken by the government, including hiring deaf people as teachers and instructors of sign language in deaf schools, and providing interpreters for deaf people in higher education."

Turkey
Turkish Sign Language is used by the country's deaf community. On 1 July 2005, the Grand National Assembly of Turkey enacted an updated Disability Law (No. 5378) which referred to sign language. According to Law No. 15, sign language is to be used in deaf education; Law No. 30 stipulates that sign language interpretation be provided to deaf people. There has been discussion in Parliament about developing a standardised sign language.

Uganda
On 8 October 1995, Uganda adopted a new constitution promoting the development of a sign language for the deaf. Ugandan Sign Language was not specified. Twenty-five-year-old Alex Ndeezi, executive director of the Uganda National Association of the Deaf from 2000 to 2014, was elected to Parliament in 1996.

United States
The federal government does not recognize any language, spoken or signed, as an official language. However, several U.S. universities accept American Sign Language credit to meet their foreign-language requirements. In some states, the study of American Sign Language is eligible for foreign language credit at the high school level. In 2015, California became the first US state to legislate language development milestone guidance pertaining to children whose first language is a signed language.

Uruguay
Although Uruguay has no "official" languages, Uruguayan Sign Language (or LSU), was legally recognised as the language of deaf persons on 10 July 2001.

In the 2008 law 18.437 (Ley General de Educación, 12 December 2008), LSU is considered (with Uruguayan Spanish and Uruguayan Portuguese) a mother tongue of Uruguayan citizens. In policy documents of the Comisión de Políticas Lingüísticas en la Educación Pública (Public Education Language Policy Commission, part of the Administración Nacional de Educación Pública or ANEP), it is proposed that LSU be the principal language of deaf education.

Venezuela
Venezuelan Sign Language was recognised in the country's constitution on 12 November 1999.

Zimbabwe
The Zimbabwean sign languages, grouped as "sign language", are recognised in the 2013 Constitution of Zimbabwe as one of the sixteen "officially recognised languages of Zimbabwe".

References

Sources
 Report on the status of Sign Languages in Europe (PDF link)
 Official Recognition of British Sign Language

External links
Décret relatif à la reconnaissance de la langue des signes (Belgian French Community decree recognising sign language)
Decreet houdende de erkenning van de Vlaamse Gebarentaal (Decree on the Recognition of Flemish Sign Language)
European Parliament Resolution on Sign Languages, 1988

Sign language
Language policy